Michael Hackett may refer to:

 Michael Hackett (athlete), Australian Paralympic athlete
 Michael Hackett (basketball) (born 1960), American professional basketball player.
 Michael Felix Hackett (1851–1926), Quebec lawyer, judge and political figure